Nelson Rodríguez (born 10 May 1955) is a Venezuelan boxer. He competed in the men's light welterweight event at the 1980 Summer Olympics.

References

1955 births
Living people
Venezuelan male boxers
Olympic boxers of Venezuela
Boxers at the 1980 Summer Olympics
Place of birth missing (living people)
Light-welterweight boxers